Sister Simona Noorenbergh (1907–1990) was a Belgian-born social worker and community organizer. The Australian author Joan Benbow writes in her book A walkabout life that in Papua New Guinea she was also known under the name Marmee.

She was born in Ypres, Belgium in 1907. She was one of the founders of the small mountain village Fane in Central Province, Papua New Guinea, where she was known in Papua New Guinea as "Sister Simona".  At the age of 84 she died in an airplane crash in the Papuan mountains on July 5, 1990.

Award 
In October 1989 she was made a Knight of the Order of Léopold II, for services to the people of Goilala and Papua New Guinea as a whole, awarded by Wilfried de Pauw, Belgian ambassador to Australia and Papua New Guinea.

Quotes 
"Having one big nose might be better than having two little ones."
"I'll never go back to Belgium. To do what? Is there still something to be done? Papua New Guinea is where I belong and were I'll die."
"My people in the tribes would consider it an honour if I offered them my body to be eaten. Having a look at myself it would for sure be a long extended meal."

Personal life 
In 1923 at the age of 16 Simona Noorenbergh read a story in a French magazine on Papua New Guinea. She told her parents that she immediately wanted to leave home to live in that country.  This was refused.  When she became very sick and her parents feared for her life they promised her that, when she got better, she would be allowed to go to New Guinea.  Soon she was cured.

As the only way to get to New Guinea was to be sent by a religious organisation, she studied to become a nun at the congregation Lady of The Sacred Heart at Stockel, Brussels.  In 1928, after she finished her novitiate she took a train from Brussels to Marseille and then left on a 3-month packet trade ship to Port Moresby where she was dropped off. She arrived at the age of 21 in the Goilala mountains by horse on December 8, 1928.

She worked and lived successively in Popole, Ononghe, Bema, Kosige, Boroko, Boregaina, Waima, Inauia and Fane.  During many years she was confronted with the dominant disease Yaws, with heavy never-ending tribe wars and with cannibalism.  In an interview with Elizabeth Kogomoni-Sowei of the Post-Courier in 1989 she mentions smiling that she was asked several times "to voluntarily offer my body for celebration. It would be considered an honour", she continues, "to be entirely and literally consumed and eaten, as in certain tribes they believe that then my spirit would stay forever in their village."

She gained respect by learning several local languages and became a jack-of-all-trades: teacher, nurse, singer, welfare officer, designer of clothes, organiser of primitive hospitals and elementary schools and educational services, and co-founder of Fane (quote Simona Noorenbergh: "This is where I belong, this is where I'll die."), the mountain village in Central Province.  Due to her respectable age, the local chiefs and people saw her as a guru and grandmother of all (the oldest age of Papuans at that time in Papua New Guinea was 50 to max 55 years) and they came by foot from far through the jungle to get her opinion on family issues and tribe problems.

At the age of 83 she went to Australia to have an eye-operation as she became practically blind. The operation succeeded but she crashed with an airplane when she got back to Fane in the Papua's. Due to a typhoon the Britten Norman Islander light aircraft hit a ridge-top in the Owen Stanley Ranges and slammed into a tree in the rugged terrain of Woitape in Central Province. Noorenbergh, sitting next to the pilot, was one of the 8 people who died, 4 survived.  She is buried in Fane where she received a local funeral.

Dedication 
The operatic trilogy "The Accacha Chronicles", a secular, contemporary classical, music drama  in Latin about Death, Birth and Love by Nicholas Lens, published by Schott Music Mainz/New York, has been entirely dedicated to Simona Noorenbergh by the author/composer.

References 
Weekend Magazine, Post-Courier of Papua New Guinea, October 20 of 1989
The Times of Papua New Guinea, July 12 of 1990
Post-Courier of Papua New Guinea, July 9, 10 and 11 of 1990
De Standaard (Belgium) of July 9 of 1990
Het Nieuwsblad (Belgium) of July 9 of 1990
La Libre Belgique (Belgium) of July 9 of 1990
Het Laatste Nieuws (Belgium) of July 9 of 1990
An adventurous walkabout life

1907 births
1990 deaths
Belgian expatriates in Papua New Guinea
Belgian Roman Catholic missionaries
20th-century Belgian Roman Catholic nuns
Belgian social workers
Roman Catholic missionaries in Papua New Guinea
Female Roman Catholic missionaries
Knights of the Order of Leopold II
Missionary educators
People from Ypres
Victims of aviation accidents or incidents in Papua New Guinea